UN numbers from UN0301 to UN0400 as assigned by the United Nations Committee of Experts on the Transport of Dangerous Goods are as follows:


UN 0301 to UN 0400

See also 
 Explosives shipping classification system

External links 
ADR Dangerous Goods, cited on 3 July 2015.
UN Dangerous Goods List from 2015, cited on 3 July 2015.
UN Dangerous Goods List from 2013, cited on 3 July 2015.

Lists of UN numbers